"Hello Vietnam" is the name of a song written by Tom T. Hall and recorded by American country singer Johnnie Wright, with lyrics in support of the Vietnam War. "Hello Vietnam" spent 20 weeks on the American Billboard Hot Country Singles & Tracks chart with three weeks at number one. The single, featuring vocals from Wright's wife, Kitty Wells, was Wright's most successful release on the US country music charts as a solo singer.

The song was satirically used for the opening theme of the anti-war film Full Metal Jacket.

Chart performance

References

American patriotic songs
1965 singles
Johnnie Wright songs
Songs written by Tom T. Hall
Song recordings produced by Owen Bradley
1965 songs
Decca Records singles
Songs about Vietnam
Songs of the Vietnam War